João Victor "JV" Horto (born September 29, 1990) is a Brazilian racing driver from Londrina.

After karting, Horto went to the United States in 2009 to compete in the Formula BMW Americas championship where he finished seventh, scoring a best finish of second at Road America. In 2010 he drove in the Star Mazda series for Team Apex. He finished 7th in points with two second-place finishes as well as two thirds. In 2011 he returned to the series, this time driving for Juncos Racing. He improved to fourth in the championship, winning the race at Mosport Park.

In 2012 he continued with Juncos Racing but moved up to the Firestone Indy Lights series, the next step in IndyCar's Mazda Road to Indy program. Horto competed in three of the first four races of the season, including the Freedom 100 before leaving the team and series. His best finish was 7th in both the Freedom 100 and at Barber Motorsports Park. He finished 15th in points.

Star Mazda Championship

Indy Lights

References

External links
 

1990 births
Brazilian racing drivers
Indy Pro 2000 Championship drivers
Formula BMW USA drivers
Sportspeople from Londrina
Living people
Indy Lights drivers

Juncos Hollinger Racing drivers